Tamar Sanikidze (born 30 August 1978 in Tbilisi) is a Georgian politician, Minister of Education and Science of Georgia since 18 July 2013 until the announcement of her resignation on June 3rd of 2016.

Education
Tamar attended Tbilisi State University from 1995 to 1998, earning a bachelor's degree, specializing in English literature. She received a master's degree at the Georgian Institute of Public Affairs in 2000, and participated in the University of Glasgow Distance Learning Program from 2003 to 2007.

Posts held
Tamar was a leading specialist for the Naval Department of the Ministry of Transport from March 1998 to July 1999.

She has held multiple positions in the Georgian Urban Institute. From 2006 to 2009, she was the financial manager for the institute, and a purchasing manager from July 2005 to May 2006. In 2005, she was made the coordinator of the institute's Resource Management Program. She was also a financial manager for the Institute of Public Affairs from 2009 to October 2012. She was appointed as Minister of Education and Science the same year, replacing Deputy Giorgi Margvelashvili, who became President of Georgia.

From May 2001 to September 2003, she was the Deputy Financial Director of the Black & Veach (UK) LTD in the Tbilisi Financial Project. From November 2000 to May 2001, she was assigned to assess construction works for the same company.

Criticisms

Sanikidze's tenure as Education Minister came under repeated criticism for the low number of teachers who passed their professional exams.

References

1978 births
Living people
Government ministers of Georgia (country)
Politicians from Tbilisi
Tbilisi State University alumni